The Popești is a left tributary of the river Nadăș in Romania. It flows into Nadăș in the northwestern outskirts of Cluj-Napoca.

References

Rivers of Romania
Rivers of Cluj County